Keith Esau (born June 10, 1960) is an American politician who served as the Kansas State Representative for the 14th district from 2013 to 2019. A member of the Republican Party, his district covers the northern part of Olathe in Johnson County. In 2017, the American Conservative Union gave him a life time rating of 88%.

He unsuccessfully sought the Republican nomination for Secretary of State of Kansas in 2018, placing fifth in a primary election that was won by Scott Schwab. He was succeeded in the state legislature by his wife, Charlotte Esau.

Sources

External links
Official Legislator Profile
Homepage
Campaign Site
Ballotpedia
Votesmart
Follow the Money

Republican Party members of the Kansas House of Representatives
1960 births
Living people
Politicians from Olathe, Kansas
Candidates in the 2018 United States elections
21st-century American politicians
Spouses of Kansas politicians